The Reverend Jim Watson (c. 1917 – 4 January 2013) was a British politician and former minister of the Audley Range United Reformed Church from 1958 to 1982. Watson served as a Labour councillor for St Thomas's ward, now known as Queen's Park, in Blackburn, Lancashire from 1964 until 1997. He also held office as the Mayor of Blackburn from 1982 to 1983.

Watson died at Royal Blackburn Teaching Hospital on 4 January 2013, at the age of 95.

References

2013 deaths
Mayors of places in Lancashire
Councillors in Lancashire
Labour Party (UK) councillors
20th-century English clergy
People from Blackburn
United Reformed Church ministers
English Calvinist and Reformed ministers
Year of birth uncertain